Michael Townley Featherstone Briggs, Lord Briggs of Westbourne,  (born 23 December 1954) is a Justice of the Supreme Court of the United Kingdom. He served earlier as a judge of the Court of Appeal of England and Wales.

Education
He was educated at Charterhouse School and Magdalen College, Oxford.

Legal career
Michael Briggs was called to the bar at Lincoln's Inn in 1978 and was the Junior Counsel to Crown Chancery from 1990-94. He became a Queen's Counsel in 1994. He was made a Bencher of Lincoln's Inn in 2001, and was appointed Attorney General of the Duchy of Lancaster on 24 July of that year. He held the post until shortly after his appointment to the High Court.

On 3 July 2006, he was appointed as a Justice of the High Court, receiving the customary knighthood and being assigned to the Chancery Division. From 2012 to 2013, Mr Justice Briggs was Vice-Chancellor of the County Palatine of Lancaster, a Chancery judge appointed by the Chancellor of the Duchy of Lancaster in consultation with the Lord Chancellor to supervise Chancery business and hear cases in the North and North East.

On 9 April 2013, Briggs was an appointed Lord Justice of Appeal and consequently appointed to the Privy Council.

It was announced on 21 July 2017 that Lord Justice Briggs would become a Justice of the Supreme Court of the United Kingdom. He took office as a Supreme Court Justice on 2 October 2017, taking the judicial courtesy title of Lord Briggs of Westbourne.

Briggs report
Lord Justice Briggs was appointed as the Judge in charge of the Chancery Modernisation Review in 2013. The report was finally published in July 2016, and came to be referred to as the Briggs report. Part of those recommendations included proposals for a new online court to try and create a more affordable dispute resolution procedure.

Notable judicial decisions

Notable decisions of Lord Briggs include:

High Court

 , on the statutory definition of insolvency
 , invalidating "exit consents" in bond documentation
 , on the proper construction of the standard form ISDA Master Agreement (upheld by the Court of Appeal on appeal)
 , on beneficiaries' information rights under a discretionary trust
Re Fort Gilkicker Ltd [2013] EWHC 348 (Ch) double derivative claims allowed

Court of Appeal

 , on Quistclose trusts
 , on the "waterfall of payments" in insolvent liquidation
 , on fixed costs for pre-action discovery

Supreme Court 

 Guest v Guest [2022] UKSC 27, on remedies to proprietary estoppel and protecting expectations

Arms

References

1954 births
Living people
Alumni of Magdalen College, Oxford
British barristers
Chancery Division judges
Judges of the Supreme Court of the United Kingdom
Knights Bachelor
Members of Lincoln's Inn
People educated at Charterhouse School
20th-century King's Counsel
Attorneys-General of the Duchy of Lancaster
Members of the Privy Council of the United Kingdom
People from Hampshire (before 1974)